Scenelloidea is an extinct superfamily of paleozoic molluscs of uncertain position (Gastropoda, Helcionelloida, or Monoplacophora).

Families 
Based on the taxonomy of the Gastropoda by Bouchet & Rocroi (2005) families in the Scenelloidea include:
 † Scenellidae
 † Coreospiridae
 † Igarkiellidae

References 

 Miller, S. A. (1889). North American Geology and Palaeontology for the use of Amateurs, Students and Scientists. Western Methodist Book Concern. Cincinnati. 664 p

Prehistoric gastropods